St. Mary's Church and Cemetery may refer to:

in the United States
 St. Mary's Episcopal Church (Newton Lower Falls, Massachusetts), listed on the NRHP as St. Mary's Church and Cemetery
 St. Mary's Church and Cemetery (Crompton, Rhode Island), listed on the NRHP in Rhode Island